Prather may refer to:

Places
United States
 Prather, California, an unincorporated community
 Prather, Clark County, Indiana, an unincorporated community

People
 Prather (surname)

Other uses
 Prather Coliseum, a multi-purpose arena in Natchitoches, Louisiana